Sri Lakshmamma Katha is a 1950 Telugu-language film, produced and directed by Ghantasala Balaramayya under the Pratibha Productions banner. It stars Akkineni Nageswara Rao and Anjali Devi, with music composed by C. R. Subburaman.

Plot
Lakshmamma (Anjali Devi), is a noblewoman, the daughter of rich landlord Musalappa Naidu (Gadepalli) who is the head of their village Durgi. She lives very happily along with her mother Peramma (Rajaratnam) and brothers Kotayya Naidu (Prabhakar Rao) & Chinna Kotayya Naidu (Master Kundu). On the other side, Venkayya Naidu (Akkineni Nageswara Rao) belongs to Lingapuram, and stays along with two elder brothers Subbayya Naidu (Kandikonda) & Ramayya Naidu (Gowrinatha Sastry), mother Venkamma (Seshamamba) and sister Pichamma (G. Varalakshmi) who left her husband. Once Venkayya visits Durgi where he sees Lakshmamma and falls in love with her. Here Musalappa keeps a condition that the bridegroom must stay along with them. Even though his mother & sister objects to it with his brothers' support Venkayya marries Lakshmamma. Time passes, and Lakshmamma gives birth to a baby girl she is named Parvathi (Baby Narayani). Meanwhile, Venkayya gets attracted to a temple dancer Rangasani (Suryaprabha). One night when he is trying to steal Lakshmamma's necklace for Rangasani, she obstructs him, he beats her very badly and leaves her in his house. Kotayya goes to bring back him but in turn, he is insulted. Now Lakshmamma goes to her in-law's house where she is deserted by her womanizing husband and is subjected to many hardships by her mother-in-law & sister-in-law. Once a hidden treasure is dug out by Lakshmamma, on this occasion Subbayya & Ramayya leaves for Kotappakonda temple along with their wives. At that time, Venkamma wants to make Parvathi's marriage with Pichamma's mad son to which Lakshmamma does not agree. Parallelly, Venkayya sees Rangasani with some other person. In that anger, he returns home when Venkamma and Pichamma make bad propaganda about Lakshmamma and makes him suspect her chastity. Venkayya stabs Lakshmamma with the knife when lighting occurs, Venkayya loses his eyesight and Venkamma & Pichamma become dumb. At last, Lakshmamma makes them normal with her devotional power. Finally, Lakshmamma is adored as a deity at Lingapuram.

Cast

Akkineni Nageswara Rao as Venkayya Naidu
Anjali Devi as Sri Lakshmamma
Kasturi Siva Rao as Rangadu
Kona Prabhakar Rao as Kotayya Naidu
Gadepalli as Musalappa Naidu
Gowrinatha Sastry as Ramayya Naidu
Kandikonda as Subbayya Naidu
G. Varalakshmi as Pichamma
Surabhi Balasaraswathi as Chitti
Suryaprabha as Rangasani
Seshamamba as Venkamma
Rajaratnam as Peramma
Kanthamma as Viswamaata
Master Kundu as Chinna Kotayya Naidu 
Baby Narayani as Parvathi

Crew
Art: S. V. S. Rama Rao
Choreography: Vedantam Raghavayya
Dialogues — Lyrics: Balijepalli Lakshmikantham, Gopalaraya Sharma
Playback: Susarla Dakshinamurthi, P. Leela, Jikki, C. R. Subburaman, Kasturi Siva Rao, 
Music: C. R. Subburaman
Editing: G. D. Joshi
Cinematography: P. Sridhar
Producer — Director: Ghantasala Balaramayya
Banner: Pratibha Productions
Release Date: 26 February 1950

Soundtrack

Music composed by C. R. Subburaman. Lyrics were written by Balijepalli Lakshmikantham, Gopalaraya Sharma. Music released on Audio Company.

References

Hindu devotional films
1950s Telugu-language films
Indian drama films
1950 drama films
Indian black-and-white films
Films scored by C. R. Subbaraman